Hubble is a surname. Notable people with the surname include:

Brian Hubble (born 1978), American painter and illustrator
Douglas Vernon Hubble (1900–1981), British physician
Eddie Hubble (born 1928), American jazz trombonist
Edwin Hubble (1889–1953), American astronomer
George Hubble (1858–1906), Australian politician
Jack Hubble (1881–1965), English cricketer
Jim Hubble (born 1942), Australian cricketer
John Hubble (disambiguation)
Margaret Hubble (1914–2006), British radio broadcaster
Philip Hubble (born 1960), British swimmer

Fictional characters

Mildred Hubble, character from The Worst Witch children's book series and television show

Surnames from given names